Physodactylinae is a subfamily of click beetles in the family Elateridae. There are at least two genera in Physodactylinae.

Genera
These two genera belong to the subfamily Physodactylinae:
 Dactylophysus Fleutiaux, 1892
 Physodactylus Fischer von Waldheim, 1823

References

Further reading

 

Elateridae
Taxa described in 1856